Marijke Elisabeth Rudolf Dillen (born 11 December 1960) is a Belgian politician and lawyer who serves as a member of the Chamber of Representatives for Vlaams Belang.

She is the daughter of Karel Dillen, the founder of the Vlaams Blok. In 1978 she graduated with a degree in Latin Greek humanities from the Onze-Lieve-Vrouw Institute in Antwerp before obtaining a law degree from the UFSIA in 1983. She registered as a lawyer at the Antwerp Bar.
Dillen became active in the former Vlaams Blok and was elected as an MP for the party in the Chamber of Representatives in 1991. During the first ever Flemish Parliament elections in 1995, she was elected for the Antwerp constituency for Vlaams Blok, and then subsequently Vlaams Belang after Vlaams Blok was dissolved before standing down in 2014. During the 2019 Belgian federal election, Dillen was returned to the Chamber of Representatives on the Antwerp constituency list.

References 

Living people
21st-century Belgian politicians
1960 births
Vlaams Belang politicians
Members of the Belgian Federal Parliament
Flemish politicians